Nová Pláň is a municipality and village in Bruntál District in the Moravian-Silesian Region of the Czech Republic. It has about 60 inhabitants. It lies on the shore of Slezská Harta Reservoir.

References

Villages in Bruntál District